is a Japanese actor, voice actor, and narrator who is affiliated with the Office Osawa agency. His major voice roles include Alucard in Hellsing, Hijikata Toshizo in Golden Kamuy, Roy Revant in Solty Rei, Giroro in Sgt. Frog, Kirei Kotomine in Fate/stay night, and the title character in Gankutsuou: The Count of Monte Cristo. In video game franchises, he voices Ieyasu Tokugawa and Kenshin Uesugi in Samurai Warriors and Warriors Orochi series, Albert Wesker in the Resident Evil franchise, Sol Badguy in the Guilty Gear series since Guilty Gear 2: Overture, Naobito Zen'in in Jujutsu Kaisen and Kazuya Mishima in the first, second and first Tag installments of the Tekken series.

Biography
Nakata studied at the Toho Gakuen College of Drama and Music. His first roles were for live-action works where his major characters portrayed included Sir Cowler in Choushinsei Flashman and Great Professor Bias in Choujuu Sentai Liveman of the Super Sentai series. He was doing theater work as well as live-action drama and voice dubbing when Michiko Nomura, who had worked on Sazae-san, suggested him to become a voice actor. Nakata said in an interview with Sutoraiku that he compared the pay for the roles and was very astonished by the difference, so he then switched to full-time voice acting.

He narrated Mobile Suit Victory Gundam which aired in 1993. In 1994, he voiced Murakumo Yagami, the series' main antagonist in Blue Seed. In the 1994 anime film Street Fighter II: The Animated Movie he voiced Balrog (Street Fighter) when the character was named M. Bison. Nakata said that his role in the 1996 anime Escaflowne helped advance his career; there he played Folken. He would continue to voice major antagonists including Gaav in Slayers Next, Stargazer in Lost Universe, and Brian J. Mason in Bubblegum Crisis Tokyo 2040.

In 2001, he voiced the antihero Alucard in the Hellsing TV series. Looking back at his career, Nakata said that Alucard was the one character he most enjoyed voicing and the easiest one to portray. He said that villain characters and ones with distinct personalities were easier than ones with not much personality as they can be shaped and changed up. He later reprised his role as Alucard in the Hellsing Ultimate OVAs.

The year 2004 saw Nakata in some breakout roles. He voiced the title character in Gankutsuou: The Count of Monte Cristo which was popular among the late night adult audience, but he also joined Sgt. Frog in voicing Corporal Giroro, which was popular with kids and adults as it aired during prime time. In 2005, he picked up voice roles as villains Megatron in Transformers Cybertron and Amshel Goldsmith in Blood+. He voiced Roy Revant, the protagonist of SoltyRei.; the director for SoltyRei would later cast him as the narrator in the Amagami SS visual novel anime adaptation.

He joined the Fate/stay night visual novel franchise, voicing Kirei Kotomine in the 2004 release, its anime adaptation in 2006, its feature film Fate/stay night: Unlimited Blade Works in 2010, and the prequel series Fate/zero. In his interview, Nakata said that co-creator Kinoko Nasu had known him since his Tokusatsu days, and that he had been involved in many of Type-Moon's titles, having voiced Nrvnqsr Chaos in Melty Blood and going on to voice Souren Araya in the anime adaptation of Kara no Kyoukai. In 2014, he reprised his role of Kirei for the Fate/stay night: Unlimited Blade Works television series.

In 2013 he was the narrator for Noucome, voiced lead character Sigmund in Unbreakable Machine-Doll, and voiced Nyanta in Log Horizon.

In video games, he voiced in the Samurai Warriors (Sengoku Musou) series as Uesugi and Tokugawa Ieyasu. In overseas dubbing, he has voiced various characters in shows and films such as 300, Sex and the City, and The Little Mermaid. Nakata said that because of his live-action background, he felt comfortable with portraying the overseas dubbing roles, although he still enjoyed the creativity coming from the two-dimensional anime characters.

Filmography

Animation

Animated films

Video games

Drama CDs

Live action

Dubbing roles

Film

TV series

Animation

Other dubbing
 Macne Nana series app – Macne Papa

References

External links
 Official agency profile 
 Goo News profile 
 
 
 

1954 births
Living people
Japanese male video game actors
Japanese male voice actors
Male voice actors from Tokyo
Toho Gakuen School of Music alumni
20th-century Japanese male actors
21st-century Japanese male actors
Ken Production voice actors